The Dumont Hills are a low mountain range in the Mojave Desert, in northeastern San Bernardino County, southern California.

The hills are just east of the southern section of the Amargosa River before it heads west into Death Valley.  They are also east of southern Death Valley National Park.

See also
Other ranges in the local area include the:
 Avawatz Mountains
 Saddle Peak Hills
 Salt Spring Hills
 Silurian Hills
 Sperry Hills
 Valjean Hills

References 

Mountain ranges of the Mojave Desert
Amargosa Desert
Mountain ranges of San Bernardino County, California
Mountain ranges of Southern California